Roberto Clemente Coliseum (Spanish: Coliseo Roberto Clemente) is a sports and concert arena located in San Juan, Puerto Rico. It was, for many years, Puerto Rico's largest indoor event facility, and remains one of the largest.

General information
The Coliseum is named after baseball hall of famer Roberto Clemente, who died in a plane crash off Luis Muñoz Marín International Airport in Carolina in 1972, while flying with relief articles to be given to victims of the Nicaragua earthquake. Construction of the facility began in the early 1970s, it was finished in January 1973, and inaugurated in February of that year by the Fania All-Stars.

The coliseum has been host to a variety of events, including world championship boxing and basketball, business expos, circus, concerts and other things.

Many Puerto Rican and international performers have been at the arena, among others.

Concerts that have been held there include:

 Saga/FM: Silent Knight/City Of Fear Tour 
January 10, 1981 (The photo that appears on the Worlds Apart Album was shot there)
 Santana: Zebop! Tour - April 18, 1981 and April 19, 1981
 Judas Priest: Point Of Entry Tour - December 15, 1981
 Quiet Riot: Metal Health Tour - December 3, 1983
 Chicago - August 17, 1984
 José José - May 10, 1985
 Bon Jovi/Ratt: The World Infestation Tour '85 - December 13, 1985
 W.A.S.P./Kiss: Asylum Tour - January 12, 1986
 John Butcher Axis/Night Ranger: Seven Wishes Tour - February 8, 1986
 Hall & Oates - May 16, 1986
 Loverboy/Dokken: Under Lock And Key Tour - July 26, 1986
 Rough Cutt/Dio: Sacred Heart Tour - October 11, 1986
 Cyndi Lauper: True Colors Tour - January 3, 1987
 38 Special/Kansas: Drastic Measures Tour - January 31, 1987
 Duran Duran: Strange Behavior Tour - August 7/8, 1987
 Def Leppard: Hysteria Tour - January 19, 1988
 Triumph: A Sport Of Kings Tour - March 25, 1988
 Saga - April 22, 1988
 R.E.O. Speedwagon/Information Society - January 7, 1989
 Jetboy/Stryper: Against The Law Tour - October 20, 1990
 Meat Loaf/Extreme: Pornograffitti Tour - January 31, 1992
 Chicago - February 29, 1992
 Gloria Estefan: Into The Light World Tour - March 14–15, 1992
 Sting: Ten Summoner's Tales Tour - March 9, 1993
 INXS: Full Moon, Dirty Hearts Tour - March 23, 1994
 Gloria Estefan: Evolution World Tour - January 17–18, 1997
 Boston: Livin' For You Tour - September 6, 1997
 El Reencuentro - 1998
 Maná: Sueños Líquidos Tour - April 10, 1998
 Simone: Brazil O Show - August, 1998
 Mötley Crüe: Greatest Hits Tour - December 12, 1998
 Puya/Kiss: Psycho Circus Tour - April 14, 1999
 Alanis Morissette: Junkie Tour - December 18, 1999
 Christina Aguilera: Christina Aguilera in Concert - January 14, 2001
 Sting: Brand New Day Tour - February 3, 2001
 Luis Fonsi: Eterno Tour - February 10/11, 2001
 Laura Pausini: 2001–2002 World Tour - October 21, 2001
 Jennifer Lopez: Let's Get Loud Concert - November 2001
 The Cranberries: Wake Up And Smell The Coffee Tour - June 9, 2002
 Firehouse/R.E.O. Speedwagon/Journey - May 8, 2004
 Boston - August 27, 2004
 Stryper - August 19, 2005
 Judas Priest: Angel Of Retribution - September 16, 2005
 Incubus - December 5, 2005
 Firehouse/Slaughter/Poison:20 Years Of Tour - August 31, 2006
 Metal Church/Queensryche - August 16, 2008
 R.E.O. Speedwagon/Kansas - October 18, 2008
 Puya/Sebastian Bach/Guns N'Roses: Chinese Democracy World Tour - April 15, 2010
 Air Supply: 2012
 Soulfly/Fear Factory: The World Industrialist Tour - August 28, 2012
 Stryper/Tesla/Bret Michaels: Get Your Rocks On Tour - October 6, 2012

Van Halen were scheduled to perform during their III Tour on September 20 and December 11, 1998, but the shows were cancelled.

It has been the home of three different BSN professional basketball teams and the BSN has also used it as a neutral site for their most important games, including game 7 of the championship finals, several times.

The Coliseum has also been used by religious leaders for conferences and religious services.

Most of the world championship boxing bouts fought in Puerto Rico during the late 1970s and early 1980s were fought at the Roberto Clemente coliseum, including Roberto Durán's world title defense versus Mexican Leoncio Ortiz, Wilfredo Gómez's knockout win against Carlos Zarate, many of Samuel Serrano's title defenses, and the fight where Muhammad Ali defended his title against Jean Pierre Coopman, the only time a world Heavyweight championship fight has been held in Puerto Rico. George Foreman had his last fight (and experienced the vision that led him to become a born-again Christian in one of its dressing  rooms) before announcing his first retirement there, and Julio César Chávez had one of his first important fights there, on the undercard of Edwin Rosario's world Lightweight championship win against José Luis Ramírez. Because of all the boxing action going on during that era, many observers call the period from the middle 1970s to the middle 1980s as the golden age of boxing in Puerto Rico.

The arena also hosted the final phase of the 1974 World Basketball championship.

The Coliseum has also been the place of large political rallies, and Puerto Rico's electoral commission uses its facilities to count votes after each election, and also hosted Miss Universe 2002, won by Oxana Fedorova of Russia. The Van Halen concert was cancelled due to a hurricane. Some days later the band sent a cargo plane with care packages.

Events

Basketball

See also

List of buildings and structures in Puerto Rico.

References

External links

Sports venues in San Juan, Puerto Rico
Indoor arenas in Puerto Rico
Basketball venues in Puerto Rico
Boxing venues in Puerto Rico
Sports venues completed in 1973
1973 establishments in Puerto Rico
Roberto Clemente